Hazem Hosny (also spelled Hazem Hosni) is an Egyptian political scientist. He was Professor of Political Science at Cairo University.

Criticism of Sisi
Hazem Hosny has criticised the policies of Abdel Fatah al-Sisi with Mahmoud Refaat. In January 2018 he supported Sami Anan's bid to contest Sisi in the 2018 Egyptian presidential election.

Arrest
Hosny was arrested without a warrant and held incommunicado in late September 2019 during the 2019 Egyptian protests. His legal defence team called for him to be released immediately. Hosny had earlier described Mohamed Ali, who earlier in September published videos accusing Sisi of corruption and calling for street protests, as playing a "positive role" and described the new protest movement as having the potential to affect the "international formula that largely determines Sisi's continued rule". Hosny argued in favour of "[stripping] Sisi of his dictatorial control of the Egyptian state".

Egyptian authorities released Hosny on 23 February 2021, after he spent about a year and a half in pre-trial detention, under the condition that he stay at home as part of his conditional release

References

Year of birth missing (living people)
Living people
Egyptian political scientists
Academic staff of Cairo University